Hungarian handball clubs have entered European handball competitions (EHF Champions League (formerly known as EHF European Cup), EHF European League (formerly known as EHF Cup), EHF European Cup (formerly known as EHF Challenge Cup) and the now defunct EHF Cup Winners' Cup).

European champions

Men's

Women's

Summary

Men's summary
Current club allocation is as following: 2 clubs (champion and runner-up) for the Champions League group stage or qualifying round, 3 clubs (league 3rd, 4th and 5th placed team or the national cup qualifier) for the EHF European League qualifying rounds.

Women's summary
Current club allocation is as following: 2 clubs (champion and runner-up) for the Champions League group stage or qualifying round, 3 clubs (league 3rd, 4th, 5th and 6th placed team or the national cup qualifier) for the EHF European League qualifying rounds.

Key to colours

Notes

Progress by season

Men's progress

Women's progress

Full European record

Men's record

EHF Champions League/European Cup
The competition was named European Cup until 1992/93, until it switched its name to EHF Champions League.

EHF European Handball League/EHF Cup/IHF Cup
While the IHF Cup (1981–1993) is recognised as the predecessor to the EHF Cup, it was not organised by EHF.

EHF/IHF Cup Winners' Cup
While the IHF Cup Winners' Cup (1976–1993) is recognised as the predecessor to the EHF Cup Winners' Cup, it was not organised by EHF. The final tournament was held in 2011–12, after which it was absorbed into the EHF Cup.

EHF City Cup
Although the tournament was founded in 1993–94, it was only taken over by EHF in 2000. After that, the name was switched to EHF Challenge Cup

Women's record

Women's EHF Champions League/European Cup
The competition was named European Cup until 1992/93, until it switched its name to EHF Champions League.

EHF Women's European Handball League/Women's EHF/IHF Cup
While the IHF Cup (1981–1993) is recognised as the predecessor to the EHF Cup, it was not organised by EHF.

Women's EHF/IHF Cup Winners' Cup
While the IHF Cup Winners' Cup (1976–1993) is recognised as the predecessor to the EHF Cup Winners' Cup, it was not organised by EHF. The final tournament was held in 2015–16, after which it was absorbed into the EHF Cup.

Women's City Cup
Although the tournament was founded in 1993–94, it was only taken over by EHF in 2000. After that, the name was switched to EHF Challenge Cup

References

External links
EHF Website
Official website of EHF Champions League
Official website of EHF and Challenge Cup
Todor66 Statistics

 
Handball clubs in European handball